Domodedovo may refer to:
Domodedovo International Airport, an airport in Russia
Domodedovo (town), a town in Moscow Oblast, Russia
Domodedovo District, an administrative raion of Moscow Oblast, Russia
Domodedovo Airlines, a defunct Russian airline
Domodedovo Moscow, an association football club